Raise Your Spirit Higher is the name of two albums by Ladysmith Black Mambazo:

 Raise Your Spirit Higher (2003 album)
 Raise Your Spirit Higher (2004 album)